Junior de Montréal may refer to one of the following hockey teams:

 Montreal Junior Hockey Club, a Major junior team 2008–2011
 Montreal Juniors, a Major junior team 1975–1982
 Montreal Juniors (LHJQ), a defunct AAA junior team